Aur Atoll (Marshallese:) is a coral atoll of 42 islands in the Pacific Ocean, and forms a legislative district of the Ratak Chain of the Marshall Islands. It is located south of Maloelap Atoll.
The population of Aur Atoll was 499 in 2011.

History
Aur Atoll was claimed by Germany along with the rest of the Marshall Islands in 1884. After World War I, the island came under the South Seas Mandate of Japan. Following the end of World War II, Aur came under the control of the United States as part of the Trust Territory of the Pacific Islands. It became part of independent Republic of the Marshall Islands in 1986.

Sister cities
Aur Atoll has Taoyuan, Taiwan as a sister city since 2018.

Education
Marshall Islands Public School System operates public schools:
 Aur Elementary School
 Tobal Elementary School

Northern Islands High School on Wotje serves the community.

References

External links
Marshall Islands site

Atolls of the Marshall Islands
Ratak Chain
Municipalities of the Marshall Islands